Public infrastructure is infrastructure owned or available for use by the public (represented by the government). It is distinguishable from generic or private infrastructure in terms of policy, financing, purpose, etc.

Public infrastructure is a general term often qualified specifically as:
 Transport infrastructure – vehicles, road, rail, cable and financing of transport
 Aviation infrastructure – air traffic control technology in aviation
 Rail transport – trackage, signals, electrification of rails
 Road transport – roads, bridges, tunnels
 Critical infrastructure – assets required to sustain human life
 Energy infrastructure – transmission and storage of fossil fuels and renewable sources
 Hazardous waste – characteristics, disposal, handling of hazardous waste
 Information and communication infrastructure – systems of information storage and distribution
 Public capital – government-owned assets
 Public works – municipal infrastructure, maintenance functions and agencies
 Solid waste – generation, collection, management of trash/garbage
 Sustainable urban infrastructure – technology, architecture, policy for sustainable living
 Water infrastructure – the distribution and maintenance of water supply
 Wastewater infrastructure – disposal and treatment of wastewater
 Infrastructure
 Infrastructure-based development

See also
 List of government buildings

Infrastructure
Infrastructure